Richard Lee (born 2 September 1959) is an Irish retired Gaelic footballer who played as a midfielder with the Galway senior team.

Honours

 Galway
 Connacht Senior Football Championship (3): 1982, 1983, 1984

References

1959 births
Living people
Moycullen Gaelic footballers
Galway inter-county Gaelic footballers